Who I Am is a 1975 album from the former Temptations singer, David Ruffin. Recorded by Van McCoy who produced and arranged the album at Mediasound Studios in New York City. The album provided Ruffin with the biggest hit of his solo career, "Walk Away From Love".

Track listing
"Who I Am" (Charles H. Kipps, Jr.)
"It Takes All Kinds of People" (Joe Cobb, Van McCoy)
"Walk Away from Love" (Charles H. Kipps, Jr.)
"I've Got Nothing But Time" (Van McCoy)
"The Finger Pointers" (Joe Cobb, Van McCoy)
"Wild Honey" (Joe Cobb, Van McCoy)
"Heavy Love" (Joe Cobb, Van McCoy)
"Statue of a Fool" (the songwriter is credited as David Ruffin on his album, but other albums have credited Jan Crutchfield as songwriter)
"Love Can Be Hazardous to Your Health" (Jesse Boyce)

According to Genna Sapia-Ruffin, common-law wife of David Ruffin, former member of The Temptations, on page 251 of her book A Memoir: David Ruffin -- My Temptation (1993-2003, 1st Books Library), Ruffin wrote and originally released the song, "Statue of a Fool", on a 78 RPM in 1958, when he was recording under the name "Little Eddie Bush.' However, as he was only seventeen years old at that time, later covers of the song gave writing credits to Jan Crutchfield. (David himself, has stated that he wrote it, in several live appearances with fellow ex-Temptation Eddie Kendrick and/or Dennis Edwards, also there is a YouTube video in which he states this just before he goes into the song.)

Personnel
David Ruffin - vocals
Eric Gale, Hugh McCracken, John Tropea - guitar
Gordon Edwards - bass
Paul Griffin, Richard Tee, Van McCoy - keyboards
Ken Bichel - synthesizer
Steve Gadd - drums
Arthur Jenkins, David Carey, George Devens - percussion
Albert Bailey, Brenda Hilliard, Diane Destry - background vocals
Bernie Glow, Marvin Stamm, Mel Davis, Mickey Gravine, Paul Faulise, Bob Alexander, Sonny Russo, Urban Green - horns
Al Brown, Cathy Keinke, Manny Vardi, Gene Orloff, Guy Lumia, Harry Lookofsky, Jesse Levy, Joe Malin, Julian Barber, Julie Schachter, Kermit Moore, Max Pollikoff, Richard Sortomme, Selwart Clarke - strings
Van McCoy - arrangements, conductor
Norman Seeff - photography

Chart history

Singles

References

1975 albums
Motown albums
David Ruffin albums